Three Green Eyes is a 1919 American silent comedy film directed by Dell Henderson and starring Carlyle Blackwell, Evelyn Greeley and Montagu Love.

Cast
 Carlyle Blackwell as 	Paul Arden
 Evelyn Greeley as 	Suzanne Russell
 Montagu Love as 	Allen Granat
 June Elvidge as 	Lucille Vale
 Johnny Hines as Johnnie Wiggan
 Jack Drumier as 	Thomas Wiggan
 Dorothy Dee as 	Marion Vale
 Mathilde Brundage as 	Ms. Vale 
 William Black as 	Capt. Arden
 Yusti Yama as Yamata
 Madge Evans as 	Child

References

Bibliography
 Connelly, Robert B. The Silents: Silent Feature Films, 1910-36, Volume 40, Issue 2. December Press, 1998.
 Munden, Kenneth White. The American Film Institute Catalog of Motion Pictures Produced in the United States, Part 1. University of California Press, 1997.

External links
 

1919 films
1919 comedy films
1910s English-language films
American silent feature films
Silent American comedy films
American black-and-white films
Films directed by Dell Henderson
World Film Company films
Films based on works by Victorien Sardou
1910s American films